Robson Pélico (born 31 January 1976), known simply as Pélico, is a Brazilian singer, songwriter, and guitarist.

Career
Although Pélico began performing music in the 1990s, and even recorded an album titled Melodrama (Dicionário Cravo Albin da Música Popular Brasileira) in 2003 (calls early album "renegado"), his musical career began in 2006. Pélico's first album  was released by Monga Records / Tratore in 2008.

Pélico's album  was released by YB Music on 16 July 2011. All sixteen tracks on the album were written by Pélico; two songs, "" and "", have additional writing credit to Cristiane Lisbôa and Estêvão Bertoni, respectively. Bass guitarist Jesus Sanchez from the São Paulo–based trio Los Pirata was the producer of the album and played on many of the tracks.

Pélico's third album Euforia was released in 2015. A recording of the song "Não há cabeça" by Ângela Rô Rô was included on the soundtrack of the Globo network's primetime telenovela Velho Chico in 2016.

Discography
  (2003)
  (2008)
  (2011)
  (2015)

Recognition
 Rolling Stone Brasil named the single "Não éramos tão assim" as No. 19 in its top 100 list for 2011.

References

External links

Brazilian singer-songwriters
Música Popular Brasileira singers
Singers from São Paulo
Living people
1976 births
21st-century Brazilian singers